Alexander Colden Rhind (October 31, 1821 – November 8, 1897) was a rear admiral in the United States Navy, who served during the Mexican–American War and American Civil War.

Biography

Early career
Rhind was born in New York City, New York, the son of Charles Rhind, a prominent shipowner who also served as Minister to Turkey from 1827. His mother, Susan Fell, was a descendant of Cadwallader Colden, the Governor of the colonial Province of New York from 1769 to 1771.

Rhind was appointed midshipman on September 3, 1838, and between 1839 and 1841 he served on the Mediterranean Station aboard the frigate  and the sloop . Promoted to passed midshipman on July 2, 1845, Rhind served on the brig  on the Coast Survey in 1845-46, which was then attached the Home Squadron on the coast of Mexico during the Mexican–American War, being present at Alvarado and Tabasco.

Rhind served on the steamer  in 1848, before rejoining the Coast 
Survey aboard the schooner Ewing on a voyage to the coast of California in 1849-50. He then served aboard the sloop  in the East Indies in 1850-51, before returning to the Coast Survey, where he remained until 1854, receiving promotion to the rank of master on April 30, 1853.

Rhind was commissioned as a lieutenant on February 17, 1854, and served on the sloop  on the Pacific Station, but in May 1855 was court-martialed after a disagreement with his commander, and left the Navy in September 1855. Eventually reinstated, Rhind served on the sloop , the flagship of the Africa Squadron from 1859-61.

Civil War
On December 14, 1861, during the American Civil War, Rhind was ordered to take command of the screw steamer ; and, while commanding her, earned the Thanks of the Navy Department in a letter dated September 7, 1864, for the capture and destruction of Confederate works commanding the South Edisto, Dawho, and Pon-Pon Rivers, in April 1862, and received promotion to lieutenant commander on July 16, 1862.

Promoted to commander on January 2, 1863, in that year he participated in the attacks on Charleston's defenses as commanding officer of the ironclad ram . During the attack on April 7, 1863, Keokuk was struck over 90 times in 30 minutes, suffering 19 holes at or near her waterline. Retiring, she was kept afloat until the following morning, before finally sinking, by which time the crew had been taken off.

Later, after commanding the gunboat  and the screw frigate , on October 23, 1863, he assumed command of the side-wheel gunboat  on the North Atlantic Blockading Squadron, and earned praise from Rear Admiral Samuel Phillips Lee for the "gallantry and endurance displayed" by himself and his crew during an engagement with three batteries at Deep Bottom on August 13, 1864.

There Commander Rhind and his crew set the fuzes and started a fire before escaping to Wilderness. The blast from the explosion, although loud, did little damage and two days later Rhind returned to close proximity to the fort to plant a marker buoy as near to the fort as possible to allow the fleet to bombard Fort Fisher at close range. Admiral Porter, in his official report to the Navy Department, wrote;
 "In conclusion, allow me to draw your attention to Commander Rhind and Lieutenant Preston. They engaged in the most perilous adventure that was, perhaps, ever undertaken. As an incentive to others I beg leave to recommend them for promotion. No one in the squadron considered that their lives would be saved, and Commander Rhind and Lieutenant Preston had made an arrangement to sacrifice themselves in case the vessel was boarded, a thing likely to happen."

In 1866 he became a Companion of the First Class of the Military Order of the Loyal Legion of the United States (MOLLUS) - a military society composed of the officers of Union armed forces and their descendants.  He was assigned MOLLUS insignia number 208.

Post-war career
After the war, Rhind served as the commander of the receiving ship  at New York City, then as commander of the Brooklyn Navy Yard in 1869-70, finally receiving promotion to the rank of captain on March 2, 1870.

He commanded the screw sloop  from 1872-76 on the European Station, receiving promotion to commodore on September 30, 1876, then serving as a Lighthouse Inspector until 1879. He was President of the Board of Inspection and Survey from 1880–1882, and then Governor of the Naval Asylum in 1883. He was promoted to rear admiral on October 30, 1883, the day before his retirement, having reached the mandatory age.

In 1890 he became a Veteran Member of the Aztec Club of 1847.

Rear Admiral Rhind died at New York, on November 8, 1897, and is buried at the Colden Family Cemetery, Montgomery, New York.

Namesake
The  , launched in July 1938, was named for him.

See also

References

1821 births
1897 deaths
American military personnel of the Mexican–American War
Members of the Aztec Club of 1847
United States Navy admirals
People of New York (state) in the American Civil War